Hyun Jae-Hyun (born February 12, 1949) is chairman of Tongyang Group, a South Korean conglomerate founded in 1957 as a cement manufacturer.

Career
Starting in the mid-1980s, Hyun began diversifying the Tongyang Group's business structure, and by 1989, he re-introduced Tongyang into the business community as a finance-based service provider. Today, in addition to being the second largest cement manufacturer in Korea, Tongyang offers a comprehensive range of financial services that include securities brokerage, investment banking, asset management and life insurance. He was arrested on January 14, 2014 on suspicions of fraudulent sales of corporate bonds and commercial papers.

In 2014 he was jailed for 12 years for fraud.

Personal life and other activities
In 1993, Hyun became the president of the Korean Baduk Association, a South Korean non-profit which aims to promote the game Go (known as baduk in Korean). He lives in Seoul with his wife and four children.

References

External links
 Tongyang Group English website
 Hyun Jae-Hyun, Daum Communications
 "CEOs vow to eradicate corruption", The Korea Herald, 19 November 2005
 , Korea JoongAng Daily, 13 April 2009
 , Korea JoongAng Daily, 1 December 2009

1949 births
Living people
South Korean chairpersons of corporations
20th-century South Korean businesspeople
Recipients of the Order of Industrial Service Merit
South Korean fraudsters
Businesspeople from Seoul